The Minister of Defence is the head of the Ministry of Defence and a member of the Cabinet and the Council of Ministers. The incumbent minister is Kajsa Ollongren of the Democrats 66 (D66) party who has been in office since 10 January 2022. Regularly a State Secretary is assigned to the Ministry who is tasked with specific portfolios. The current State Secretary is Christophe van der Maat of the People's Party for Freedom and Democracy (VVD) who also has been in office since 10 January 2022.

History

Role

List of officeholders

Minister of Defence (1928–1941)

Minister of Defence (since 1948)

List of State Secretaries for Defence

See also
 Ministry of Defence
 Chief of Defence

References

Military of the Netherlands
Defence
 
Netherlands